Cathetus is a monotypic genus of moths in the family Uraniidae. The only species is Cathetus euthysticha. It was described by Fletcher, in 1979. This genus occurs mainly in southeast Asia and in Australia.

References 

Uraniidae